June Events are alternatives to May Balls held by some Cambridge colleges.

The necessarily high price of May Ball tickets motivates some colleges to host Events instead. These evenings, tending to be shorter in duration and of a much lower key, are more affordable but constrained by a much lower budget.

Alternation
Some colleges chose to alternate between a May Ball and a June Event each year. Emmanuel College's May Ball is held in May Week every other year, with alternate years featuring an Event on Suicide Sunday.

In 2006, members of the College voted in favour of restoring Pembroke College's lost tradition of hosting a May Ball for 2007. In 2008 they will hold another June Event.

External links 
 Trinity Hall June Event
 Emmanuel June Event
 King's Affair
 Pembroke June Event
 Wolfson June Event

Terminology of the University of Cambridge
June events
Balls in the United Kingdom
Culture of the University of Cambridge